Antonio Magsaysay Diaz (1927–2011) was a politician and lawyer. He was elected to the House of Representatives of the Philippines representing Zambales for three separate tenures – 1969 to 1972, 1992 to 2001, and 2004 until his death on August 3, 2011.

Early life
Diaz, a nephew of the late-president Ramon Magsaysay, member of the Magsaysay political clan of Zambales, was variously the vice governor and representative of the province since the 1960s.

Diaz obtained a law degree from the Ateneo de Manila University in 1954.

According to a statement from the family, Diaz gave the bulk of his pork barrel funds to his scholarship program which included the provision of tuition money and stipends to some 500,000 high school and college students not only in his district but in the entire province. In the last 10 years, Diaz allocated approximately P500 million for this program alone.

Records from Diaz's office showed that public school students in the district receive at least P1,000 each a year while those in private schools get at least P4,000 each. Camat said the funds given to students are supplemented by bonuses and other forms of assistance given to the scholars and their families. He said the scholarship program was the key to Diaz's political clout with voters in the province.

He made his career in government service, starting out as deputy customs commissioner (1963–1964), head of the legal department of the Land Reform Commission (1964–1965), and was subsequently elected vice governor of Zambales (1967–1969), before winning the first of many congressional terms in 1969. He was also a member of the Batasang Pambansa in 1984. Diaz's mother, Mercedes, is a sister of the late President Ramon Magsaysay.

Personal life
He was married to Felmida V. Diaz with four children: Ramon Victor, Roderick Albert, Roberto Carlos and Rica Victoria, daughters-in-law Carla, Yveth, and Anna, son-in-law Ronald Arambulo and grandchildren Regina Isabel, Marianna Antonia, Bianca Alberta, Ricardo, Paquito, Rafael, Sabrina Victoria and Sidney Louise.

Education
Elementary: Castillejos Elementary School (1934–1940)
High School: Letran College (1940–1950)
College: Ateneo de Manila University; Associate in Arts, graduated magna cum laude (1952) and Bachelor of Laws (1954)

Career history
Professor of political science of Far Eastern University (1955–1957)
Head executive assistant; Head, legal department of Land Reform Commission (1956–1958)
Vice president of Federation of Free Farmers (1956–1957)
Barangay captain of Santa Maria, Castillejos, Zambales (1958–1961)
Chief executive assistant Department of Finance (1961–1963)
Deputy commissioner, Bureau of Customs (1963–1964)
Legal consultant, Benguet Consolidated Mining Corporation (1964–1966)
Chairperson, PNB Provident Fund of Philippine National Bank (1966–1970)
Provincial vice governor of Zambales (1967–1969)
Director of Philippine National Railways (1967–1969)
Representative, lone district, Zambales House of Representatives (1969–1972)
Director and senior vice president, Philtrust Company (1978–1984)
Representative of Batasang Pambansa (1984–1986)
Deputy minister, Department of Tourism (1985–1986)
Partner, Albano, Garcia, Diaz Law Office (1987–1992)
Representative, 2nd district, Zambales House of Representatives (1969–1972;1992–2001; 2004–2010)

Death
He died on August 3, 2011 (Wednesday) cause of multiple organ failure secondary to sepsis and pneumonia at St. Luke's Medical Center in Quezon City. He was 83. Teodoro Camat, who heads Diaz's office in Zambales’ 2nd congressional district, said the lawmaker died at 6:20 am. Camat said Diaz's body will be taken to the Iba Cathedral here on Saturday after necrological services at the House of Representatives. The body will then be transferred for the wake in his hometown at San Marcelino, Zambales.

References

1927 births
2011 deaths
People from Olongapo
Members of the House of Representatives of the Philippines from Zambales
Lakas–CMD politicians
Labor Party Philippines politicians
20th-century Filipino lawyers
Ateneo de Manila University alumni
Magsaysay family
Deaths from pneumonia in the Philippines
Deaths from sepsis
Deaths from multiple organ failure
Members of the Batasang Pambansa
Macapagal administration personnel
Ferdinand Marcos administration personnel